Haley Jean McCutcheon (born February 22, 1996) is an American soccer player who plays as a defender for Orlando Pride in the National Women's Soccer League (NWSL). She has previously played for Houston Dash of the NWSL and for Melbourne Victory in the Australian W-League. She made her senior international debut for the United States in 2018.

Club career

Houston Dash, 2018–2022
McCutcheon was chosen by the Houston Dash with the 7th overall pick in the 2018 NWSL College Draft out of the University of Nebraska. She signed with the Dash and made her debut on March 25, 2018, in a 1–1 draw against Chicago Red Stars.

Orlando Pride, 2022–present
On August 18, 2022, McCutcheon was acquired via trade by Orlando Pride in exchange for $75,000 in allocation money and a second-round pick in the 2023 NWSL Draft.

International career
McCutcheon received her first call-up to the United States Women's National Team in April 2018 as she was added to the roster as a replacement for Kelley O'Hara who pulled out due to injury. She earned her first cap on April 8 in a friendly against Mexico.

On August 23, 2018, she was named to the United States U-23 team for the 2018 Nordic tournament.

Personal life
She married her husband Payne McCutcheon in December 2022.

Career statistics

College

Club
.

International

References

External links

1996 births
Living people
National Women's Soccer League players
A-League Women players
Houston Dash players
Melbourne Victory FC (A-League Women) players
Orlando Pride players
Sportspeople from Overland Park, Kansas
Soccer players from Kansas
American women's soccer players
Nebraska Cornhuskers women's soccer players
Houston Dash draft picks
United States women's international soccer players
Women's association football midfielders